Eurekapegma is a helcionellid from the Middle Cambrian of New Zealand.  It is flattened sideways, with a dividing wall within its shell; it resembles the helcionellid Eotebenna.

References

Prehistoric mollusc genera
Cambrian molluscs
Helcionelloida
Molluscs of New Zealand
Prehistoric invertebrates of Oceania